Wei Qingkun (born 7 October 1966) is a Chinese wrestler. He competed at the 1988 Summer Olympics and the 1992 Summer Olympics.

References

External links
 

1966 births
Living people
Chinese male sport wrestlers
Olympic wrestlers of China
Wrestlers at the 1988 Summer Olympics
Wrestlers at the 1992 Summer Olympics
Place of birth missing (living people)
20th-century Chinese people
21st-century Chinese people